Cedi Osman (born 8 April 1995) is a Turkish professional basketball player for the Cleveland Cavaliers of the National Basketball Association (NBA). He plays the small forward position.

Early years
Osman was born in Ohrid, Macedonia, modern-day North Macedonia to a Turkish father and a Bosniak mother (from Novi Pazar, Serbia). He has an older brother, Caner, who is also a basketball player. He started playing basketball with KK Bosna's youth teams in 2001. Due to his paternal Turkish background, he became a Turkish citizen, as per Turkey's right-of-return laws. Since then, he has also represented the Turkey men's national basketball team.

Professional career

Anadolu Efes (2011–2017)

In 2007, Osman signed a youth team contract with Anadolu Efes after his outstanding performance at KK Bosna. He played for the junior, star, and youth teams of Anadolu Efes. He was loaned for the 2011–12 season to the Pertevniyal of the Turkish Basketball First League, which was at the time the farm team of Anadolu Efes. In the summer of 2012, Osman signed a professional contract with the Anadolu Efes senior team.

Cleveland Cavaliers (2017–present)
On 25 June 2015, Osman was selected with the 31st overall pick in the 2015 NBA draft, by the Minnesota Timberwolves. His draft rights, along with those of Rakeem Christmas and a future draft pick, were then traded to the Cleveland Cavaliers, in exchange for the draft rights to Tyus Jones that same night.

On 18 July 2017, Osman signed with the Cleveland Cavaliers. On 9 February 2018, Osman played 38 minutes in a 123-107 Cavaliers victory over the Atlanta Hawks. He contributed 16 points on 6-of-9 shooting while notching 6 rebounds, 5 assists, and 3 steals. The Cavaliers made it to the 2018 NBA Finals, but lost 4-0 to the Golden State Warriors.

On 25 January 2019, in a 100–94 loss to the Miami Heat, Osman scored a career-high 29 points. Four days later, Osman was named a participant for the 2019 Rising Stars Challenge as a member of the World Team.

On October 26, 2019, Osman signed a contract extension with the Cavaliers.

On March 22, 2022, Osman recorded his 500th 3 pointer as a member of the Cavaliers. This made him just the 9th Cavaliers player ever to join the 500+ 3 point club.

National team career

Junior national team
Osman was a member of the junior national teams of Turkey. He played at the following tournaments with Turkey's junior national teams: the 2011 FIBA Europe Under-16 Championship, the 2012 FIBA Europe Under-18 Championship, the 2012 Albert Schweitzer Tournament, where he won a bronze medal and was named the Most Talented Player, the 2013 FIBA Europe Under-18 Championship, where he won a gold medal, and at the 2014 FIBA Europe Under-20 Championship, where he also won a gold medal, and was named to the All-Tournament Team and selected as the MVP.

Senior national team
After playing with the junior national teams of Turkey, Osman became a member of the senior men's Turkish national basketball team. With Turkey's senior national team, he has played at the 2014 FIBA Basketball World Cup, EuroBasket 2015, and the 2016 Manila FIBA World Olympic Qualifying Tournament.

Career statistics

NBA

Regular season

|-
| style="text-align:left;"| 
| style="text-align:left;"| Cleveland
| 61 || 12 || 11.0 || .484 || .368 || .565 || 2.0 || .7 || .4 || .0 || 3.9
|-
| style="text-align:left;"| 
| style="text-align:left;"| Cleveland
| 76 || 75 || 32.2 || .427 || .348 || .779 || 4.7 || 2.6 || .8 || .1 || 13.0
|-
| style="text-align:left;"| 
| style="text-align:left;"| Cleveland
| 65 || 65 || 29.4 || .437 || .383 || .670 || 3.6 || 2.4 || .8 || .2 || 11.0
|-
| style="text-align:left;"| 
| style="text-align:left;"| Cleveland
| 59 || 26 || 25.6 || .374 || .306 || .800 || 3.4 || 2.9 || .9 || .2 || 10.4
|-
| style="text-align:left;"| 
| style="text-align:left;"| Cleveland
| 66 || 3 || 22.2 || .432 || .357 || .664 || 2.2 || 2.0 || .8 || .2 || 10.7
|- class “sortbottom”
| style="text-align:center;" colspan="2"| Career
| 327 || 181 || 24.5 || .423 || .349 || .718 || 3.2 || 2.1 || .7 || .1 || 10.0

Playoffs

|-
| style="text-align:left;"| 2018
| style="text-align:left;"| Cleveland
| 14 || 0 || 4.4 || .333 || .143 || .250 || .5 || .2 || .2 || .0 || 1.0
|- class="sortbottom"
| style="text-align:center;" colspan="2"| Career
| 14 || 0 || 4.4 || .333 || .143 || .250 || .5 || .2 || .2 || .0 || 1.0

EuroLeague

|-
| style="text-align:left;"| 2013–14
| style="text-align:left;" rowspan="4"|Anadolu Efes
| 13 || 0 || 11.6 || .436 || .524 || .400 || 1.7 || .9 || .5 || .1 || 3.8 || 3.5
|-
| style="text-align:left;"| 2014–15
| 27 || 7 || 19.3 || .397 || .303 || .667 || 3.7 || 1.1 || .7 || .3 || 6.7 || 6.7
|-
| style="text-align:left;"| 2015–16
| 23 || 12 || 20.0 || .441 || .380 || .763 || 3.1 || .7 || .9 || .1 || 7.9 || 8.1
|-
| style="text-align:left;"| 2016–17
| 35 || 34 || 18.6 || .409 || .340 || .787 || 2.8 || .8 || .6 || .1 || 7.1 || 6.3
|- class="sortbottom"
| style="text-align:center;" colspan="2"| Career
| 98 || 53 || 18.2 || .416 || .356 || .710 || 2.9 || .9 || .7 || .1 || 6.7 || 6.5

Personal life
Osman became engaged to Ebru Şahin, a Turkish actress in September 2021. They were married in July 2022.

References

External links

 
 Cedi Osman at DraftExpress.com
 Cedi Osman at EuroLeague
 Cedi Osman at TBLStat.net
 
 

1995 births
Living people
2014 FIBA Basketball World Cup players
2019 FIBA Basketball World Cup players
Anadolu Efes S.K. players
Canton Charge players
Cleveland Cavaliers players
Minnesota Timberwolves draft picks
National Basketball Association players from Turkey
Pertevniyal S.K. players
Point guards
Shooting guards
Small forwards
Sportspeople from Ohrid
Turkish expatriate basketball people in the United States
Turkish men's basketball players
Turkish people of Bosniak descent
Turkish people of Macedonian descent
Turkish people of Serbian descent